Ti Lawka Sanda Dewi was a chief queen consort of King Sithu I of Pagan (Bagan). She was a senior queen until  1150s when she succeeded Queen Yadanabon as the chief queen (usaukpan). Sanda Dewi had a son named Htauk Hlayga. Her younger sister was also a queen of Sithu with the title of Yazakumari.

References

Bibliography
 

Chief queens consort of Pagan
Year of death unknown
Year of birth unknown
12th-century Burmese women